Robert Anderson (January 6, 1922 – April 5, 1996) was an American diplomat who served as the United States Ambassador to Dahomey, Morocco, and the Dominican Republic.

Early life and education 
Anderson was born in Boston, Massachusetts. After graduating from Yale University, he served as a first lieutenant in the United States Army during World War II.

Career 
Anderson joined the Foreign Service after the war, and served in consular positions during the 1950s and 1960s, before being appointed U.S. ambassador to Dahomey in 1972. He served as ambassador to Dahomey from 1972 to 1974, to Morocco from 1976 to 1978, and the Dominican Republic from 1982 to 1985. In the 1970s, Anderson also served as an assistant and spokesman for Henry Kissinger.

Death 
Anderson died of congestive heart failure at Fairfax Hospital in Fairfax, Virginia, at the age of 74. At the time of his death, he was a resident of Georgetown.

References

1922 births
1996 deaths
People from Boston
Ambassadors of the United States to Benin
Ambassadors of the United States to Morocco
Ambassadors of the United States to the Dominican Republic
United States Department of State spokespeople
United States Foreign Service personnel
People from Georgetown (Washington, D.C.)
Yale University alumni
United States Army personnel of World War II
United States Army officers
Military personnel from Massachusetts